Assassination is a 1967 Italian thriller-spy film  starring Henry Silva. It marked the directorial debut of Emilio Miraglia.

Plot
A Secret Service agent, supposedly dead, discovers that his wife is planning to marry the double agent he must expose.

Cast
 Henry Silva as John Chandler / Philip Chandler 
 Fred Beir as Bob 
 Evelyn Stewart as Barbara
 Peter Dane as Lang 
 Bill Vanders as Thomas 
 Fred Farrell as Morrison (as Fred Farrell)
 Roberto Maldera as Otto (as Bob Molden)
 Karl-Heinz Menzinger as Hans (as Karl Menzinger)
 Gunther Scholtz as Senator
 Gert von Zitzewitz as Baron

Reception
The Italian film critic Francesco Puma described the film as "ambiguous, crepuscular and uneasy" and as a Eurospy version of The Late Mattia Pascal.

References

External links

1960s spy thriller films
Italian spy thriller films
Films directed by Emilio Miraglia
Films set in the United States
Films set in West Germany
1960s Italian films